Cinecolor was an early subtractive color-model two-color motion picture process that was based upon the Prizma system of the 1910s and 1920s and the Multicolor system of the late 1920s and the 1930s. It was developed by William T. Crispinel and Alan M. Gundelfinger, and its various formats were in use from 1932 to 1955.

Method

As a bipack color process, the photographer loaded a standard camera with two film stocks: an orthochromatic strip dyed orange-red and a panchromatic strip behind it. The orthochromatic film stock recorded only blue and green, and its orange-red dye (analogous to a Wratten 23-A filter) filters out everything but orange and red light to the panchromatic film stock.

Since the distance to the two film emulsions differed in depth from a single emulsion, the camera's lens focus had to be adjusted and a special film gate added to accommodate a bi-pack negative.

In the laboratory, the negatives were developed and the orange-red dye removed. The prints were made on duplitized film and developed as black and white positives. One side containing the red-orange filtered recorded and the soundtrack was toned blue-green; the other side containing the blue-green record was toned red-orange.

Cinecolor could produce vibrant reds, oranges, blues, browns and flesh tones, but its renderings of other colors such as bright greens (rendered dark green) and purples (rendered a sort of dark magenta) were muted.

History
The Cinecolor process was invented in 1932 by the English-born cinematographer William Thomas Crespinel (1890–1987), who joined the Kinemacolor Corporation in 1906 and went to New York in 1913 to work with Kinemacolor's American unit. After that company folded in 1916, he worked for Prizma, another color film company, founded by William Van Doren Kelley. He later worked for Multicolor and patented several inventions in the field of color cinematography.

Crespinel founded Cinecolor, Inc. (later Cinecolor Corporation) in 1932 as a response to the success of the Technicolor Corporation, which held a partial monopoly on motion picture color. William Loss, a director of the Citizens Traction Company in New York, was its principal investor. The company bought four acres of land in Burbank, California for its processing plant. Crespinel retired as president of Cinecolor in 1948.

The company was largely founded on the patents and equipment of William Van Doren Kelley and his Prizma Color system, and was in direct competition with Multicolor, which folded in 1932, and Cinecolor then bought its equipment. Although limited in tone by comparison, Cinecolor's chief advantages over Technicolor were that color rushes were available within 24 hours, the process itself cost only 25% more than black-and-white photography (the price grew cheaper as larger amounts of Cinecolor film stock were bought), and it could be used in modified black-and-white cameras. 

Before 1945, Cinecolor was used almost exclusively for short films. From 1932 to 1935, Cinecolor was used in at least 22 cartoons, including Fleischer Studios cartoons for Paramount, Hugh Harman and Rudolf Ising for MGM; and Ub Iwerks, whose Comicolor cartoons were released by the independent distributor Pat Powers while Walt Disney held an exclusive contract with Technicolor for the use of its three-strip process for animation. Among the best known animated short subjects series made in Cinecolor were Poor Cinderella, the first installment of Max Fleischer's Color Classics and Ub Iwerks' ComiColor cartoons, several 1930s and 1940s Warner Bros. Looney Tunes, many of Famous Studios' late-1940s Popeye the Sailor cartoons, and Screen Gems' Phantasies from 1947 to 1949.

The first feature-length pictures released in Cinecolor were the documentary feature Sweden, Land of the Vikings (1934) and the independently-made western The Phantom of Santa Fe (1936, but filmed in Multicolor in 1931), followed by Monogram Pictures' release The Gentleman from Arizona (1939). No other Cinecolor features followed until 1945. Lower-budgeted companies such as Monogram, Producers Releasing Corporation, and Screen Guild Productions were Cinecolor's chief employers. A 1945 PRC Cinecolor release, The Enchanted Forest, was the studio's highest-grossing film, and PRC's series of Cinecolor westerns with Eddie Dean attracted attention among exhibitors. Screen Guild's Scared to Death (1947) featured Bela Lugosi in his only color film. 

The commercial and critical success of those films led both major and minor studios to use Cinecolor as a money-saving measure. The system could produce acceptable color pictures at a fraction of the cost of Technicolor such as MGM's Gallant Bess (1946), Columbia's costume adventureThe Gallant Blade (1948), and Eagle-Lion's Red Ryder westerns. Most features made in Cinecolor were westerns because the main color palette in those films consisted of blues, browns, and reds and so the system's limitations were less apparent.

Cinecolor was also prominently employed in processing Paramount's Popular Science series of short films although later prints were made by Consolidated Film Industries under their Magnacolor process. Hal Roach Studios made all of his postwar featurettes in Cinecolor; his was the first Hollywood studio with an all-color schedule. The last American feature released in Cinecolor was Allied Artists' Pride of the Blue Grass (1954). 

Republic Pictures began using CFI's Trucolor from the end of 1946 for a variety of films ranging from Westerns, travelogues, and epics of the life of Richard Wagner (Magic Fire) and the battle of the Alamo (The Last Command). Trucolor differed, however, in that it used a dye-coupler already built into the film base, rather than the application of chemical toner.

SuperCinecolor
The year 1948 was important for the Cinecolor Corp, which introduced a new supersensitive negative stock that cut back on the on-set lighting costs by 50 percent and  camera film magazines. Combined, they reduced the cost of shooting in Cinecolor to only 10 percent more than black and white.

The same year, Gundelfinger also developed a three-color process called SuperCinecolor but did not begin using it until 1951 with The Sword of Monte Cristo. Other films of note that used the SuperCinecolor process were Abbott and Costello Meet Captain Kidd (1952), Jack and the Beanstalk (1952), Invaders From Mars (1953), Gog (1954), and Top Banana (1954). The latter two were both also filmed in 3-D.

SuperCinecolor used black-and-white separations produced from monopack color negatives made with Ansco/Agfa, DuPont, Kodachrome, or Eastmancolor film, for principal photography. After the negative was edited, it was copied through color filters into three black-and-white negatives. An oddity of the system was that rather than using cyan, magenta, and yellow primary subtractive colors, SuperCinecolor printed its films with red, blue and yellow matrices to create a system that was compatible with the previous printers. The result of the combination of the color spectra was an oddly-striking look to the final print.

Printing SuperCinecolor was not a difficult process, as it was engineered to use the old process' equipment. Using duplitized stock, one side contained a silver emulsion toned red-magenta and, on the other side, cyan-blue. A yellow layer was added on the blue side by imbibition. The soundtrack was subsequently applied on the blue-yellow side in a blue soundtrack but separate from those records. The final prints had vivid dyes that did not fade and were of acceptable grain structure and sharp in focus. The common perception of Cinecolor prints being grainy and not easily focused is perpetuated by 16 mm, regular-process Cinecolor prints in which those elements are an issue.

Last years
Cinecolor Corp. operated at a net loss from 1950 to 1954, partly because the weak financial position of its division in England made it necessary for the parent company to refinance it and partly because of its own operating losses. Donner Corporation, a private investment organization, acquired Cinecolor Corp. in June 1952. In 1953, it became the Color Corporation of America, specialized in SuperCinecolor printing, and was a major Anscocolor processor. It also made Eastmancolor prints and did commercial film processing and printing of non-theatrical films, and black-and-white film processing for television. To stimulate its theatrical film business, Color Corp. financed independent movie producers. The last theatrical feature with a SuperCinecolor credit was The Diamond Queen, released by Warner Bros. in November 1953. Thereafter, "Color by Color Corp. of America" was used for films like Shark River (1953) and Top Banana (1954).

Color Corporation of America was bought out on April 8, 1954 by Houston Color Film Laboratories, which processed Anscocolor at its plant in Los Angeles, and Houston Fearless Corp., which made processing and developing equipment. It became strictly an Anscocolor processor. Color Corp. sold its film processing laboratory in mid-1955 to provide its television and motion picture equipment-making division a laboratory in which to test its equipment, and the corporation was dissolved.

See also
Color motion picture film
Color photography
List of color film systems
List of film formats
Multicolor
Prizma
Technicolor
Trucolor

References

Further reading
John Belton, "Cinecolor," Film History 12:4 (2000), pp. 344-357.
Gene Fernett, Hollywood's Poverty Row 1930-1950 (Coral Reef Publications, 1973), pp 15-19.

External links
 Cinecolor History at The American Widescreen Museum
 Cinecolor on Timeline of Historical Film Colors with many written resources and many photographs of Cinecolor prints.

Film and video technology
History of film
Motion picture film formats
Audiovisual introductions in 1932